The Vels is a river in Perm Krai, Russia, a left tributary of the Vishera. It starts on the east slope of Mount Isherim, in the Vishera Nature Reserve. Its mouth is near the settlement of Vels.
It is a mountain river with rapid flow. There are some small rocks along its banks downstream of Posmak River.

Main tributaries:
Left: Bolshaya Martayka, Posmak, Chural, Shchudya
Right: only small insignificant rivers

References

External links 
www.uraltravel.com

Rivers of Perm Krai